Homelo Vi (born 5 August 1967) is a Tongan athlete. He competed in the men's decathlon at the 1992 Summer Olympics.

References

External links
 

1967 births
Living people
Athletes (track and field) at the 1992 Summer Olympics
Tongan decathletes
Olympic athletes of Tonga
Athletes (track and field) at the 1990 Commonwealth Games
Commonwealth Games competitors for Tonga
People from Tongatapu